The 2014–15 Houston Rockets season was the 48th season of the franchise in the National Basketball Association (NBA), and the 44th in the Houston area.

The Rockets finished the regular season with a 56–26 record, the third best in franchise history. They also won their first ever Southwest Division title and first Division crown since 1994. The Rockets beat the Dallas Mavericks 4–1 in the first round, advancing to the Western Conference Semifinals for the first time since 2009. They beat the Los Angeles Clippers in seven games after trailing the series 1–3, advancing to the Western Conference Finals for the first time since 1997. They became just the ninth team in NBA history to come back from such a deficit. The Rockets' season ended with a 1–4 loss in the Western Conference Finals to the eventual NBA champion Golden State Warriors.

Draft picks

Standings

Game log

Preseason

|- style="background:#bfb;"
| 1 || October 7 || @ Dallas
| 
| Donatas Motiejūnas (18)
| Howard, Papanikolaou (6)
| Patrick Beverley (4)
| American Airlines Center17,227
| 1–0
|- style="background:#bfb;"
| 2 || October 9 || Memphis
| 
| James Harden (21)
| Tarik Black (15)
| Harden, Johnson (4)
| Toyota Center15,301
| 2–0
|- style="background:#bfb;"
| 3 || October 13 || Phoenix
| 
| Terrence Jones (18)
| Black, Jones (7)
| Isaiah Canaan (3)
| Toyota Center14,642
| 3–0
|- style="background:#fbb;"
| 4 || October 14 || @ New Orleans
| 
| Canaan, Papanikolaou (13)
| Ariza, Black (5)
| Ariza, Beverley, Smith (3)
| Toyota Center14,266
| 3–1
|- style="background:#bfb;"
| 5 || October 19 || Golden State
| 
| James Harden (15)
| Dorsey, Howard (8)
| James Harden (6)
| State Farm Arena5,647
| 4–1
|- style="background:#fbb;"
| 6 || October 21 || @ Miami
| 
| Harden, Howard (19)
| Donatas Motiejūnas (10)
| Beverley, Smith (3)
| American Airlines Arena19,600
| 4–2
|- style="background:#bfb;"
| 7 || October 22 || @ Orlando
| 
| Canaan, Daniels (14)
| Black, Jones (8)
| Kostas Papanikolaou (5)
| Amway Center14,742
| 5–2
|- style="background:#bfb;"
| 8 || October 24 || San Antonio
| 
| James Harden (25)
| Terrence Jones (13)
| Kostas Papanikolaou (4)
| Toyota Center18,305
| 6–2

Regular season

|- style="background:#cfc;"
| 1 || October 28 || @ L.A. Lakers
| 
| James Harden (32)
| Terrence Jones (13)
| James Harden (6)
| Staples Center18,997
| 1–0
|- style="background:#cfc;"
| 2 || October 29 || @ Utah
| 
| Dwight Howard (22)
| Dwight Howard (10)
| James Harden (10)
| EnergySolutions Arena19,911
| 2–0

|- style="background:#cfc;"
| 3 || November 1 || Boston
| 
| James Harden (26)
| Terrence Jones (10)
| James Harden (6)
| Toyota Center18,309
| 3–0
|- style="background:#cfc;"
| 4 || November 3 || @ Philadelphia
| 
| James Harden (35)
| Dwight Howard (14)
| Trevor Ariza (7)
| Wells Fargo Center12,896
| 4–0
|- style="background:#cfc;"
| 5 || November 4 || @ Miami
| 
| Dwight Howard (26)
| Dwight Howard (10)
| James Harden (10)
| American Airlines Arena19,666
| 5–0
|- style="background:#cfc;"
| 6 || November 6 || San Antonio
| 
| Dwight Howard (32)
| Dwight Howard (16)
| James Harden (6)
| Toyota Center18,311
| 6–0
|- style="background:#fcc;"
| 7 || November 8 || Golden State
| 
| James Harden (22)
| Trevor Ariza (11)
| James Harden (7)
| Toyota Center18,312
| 6–1
|- style="background:#cfc;"
| 8 || November 12 || @ Minnesota
| 
| James Harden (23)
| Dwight Howard (10)
| James Harden (10)
| Mexico City Arena18,996
| 7–1
|- style="background:#cfc;"
| 9 || November 14 || Philadelphia
| 
| James Harden (35)
| Dwight Howard (16)
| James Harden (7)
| Toyota Center18,138
| 8–1
|- style="background:#cfc;"
| 10 || November 16 || @ Oklahoma City
| 
| James Harden (19)
| Harden, Howard, Motiejūnas (9)
| James Harden (5)
| Chesapeake Energy Arena18,203
| 9–1
|- style="background:#fcc;"
| 11 || November 17 || @ Memphis
| 
| Trevor Ariza (16)
| Dwight Howard (9)
| Kostas Papanikolaou (5)
| FedExForum17,012
| 9–2
|- style="background:#fcc;"
| 12 || November 19 || L.A. Lakers
| 
| James Harden (24)
| Tarik Black (9)
| James Harden (7)
| Toyota Center18,245
| 9–3
|- style="background:#cfc;"
| 13 || November 22 || Dallas
| 
| James Harden (32)
| Donatas Motiejūnas (12)
| Jason Terry (5)
| Toyota Center18,244
| 10–3
|- style="background:#cfc;"
| 14 || November 24 || New York
| 
| James Harden (36)
| Donatas Motiejūnas (8)
| James Harden (6)
| Toyota Center18,133
| 11–3
|- style="background:#cfc;"
| 15 || November 26 || Sacramento
| 
| James Harden (26)
| James Harden (7)
| James Harden (8)
| Toyota Center18,058
| 12–3
|- style="background:#fcc;"
| 16 || November 28 || L.A. Clippers
| 
| James Harden (16)
| Tarik Black (9)
| James Harden (6)
| Toyota Center18,226
| 12–4
|- style="background:#cfc;"
| 17 || November 29 || @ Milwaukee
| 
| James Harden (34)
| Trevor Ariza (10)
| James Harden (8)
| BMO Harris Bradley Center16,119
| 13–4

|- style="background:#cfc;"
| 18 || December 3 || Memphis
| 
| James Harden (21)
| Tarik Black (11)
| Jason Terry (5)
| Toyota Center18,151
| 14–4
|- style="background:#cfc;"
| 19 || December 5 || @ Minnesota
| 
| James Harden (38)
| Trevor Ariza (9)
| Harden, Terry (6)
| Target Center12,101
| 15–4
|- style="background:#cfc;"
| 20 || December 6 || Phoenix
| 
| Ariza, Beverley (19)
| James Harden (12)
| James Harden (7)
| Toyota Center18,060
| 16–4
|- style="background:#fcc;"
| 21 || December 10 || @ Golden State
| 
| James Harden (34)
| James Harden (8)
| Patrick Beverley (5)
| Oracle Arena19,596
| 16–5
|- style="background:#cfc;"
| 22 || December 11 || @ Sacramento
| 
| James Harden (44)
| Patrick Beverley (10)
| James Harden (8)
| Sleep Train Arena16,676
| 17–5
|- style="background:#cfc;"
| 23 || December 13 || Denver
| 
| Dwight Howard (26)
| Dwight Howard (13)
| James Harden (10)
| Toyota Center18,136
| 18–5
|- style="background:#cfc;"
| 24 || December 17 || @ Denver
| 
| James Harden (41)
| Dwight Howard (16)
| James Harden (10)
| Pepsi Center12,107
| 19–5
|- style="background:#fcc;"
| 25 || December 18 || New Orleans
| 
| James Harden (21)
| Dwight Howard (13)
| James Harden (5)
| Toyota Center18,137
| 19–6
|- style="background:#fcc;"
| 26 || December 20 || Atlanta
| 
| Dwight Howard (19)
| Dwight Howard (11)
| James Harden (14)
| Toyota Center16,998
| 19–7
|- style="background:#cfc;"
| 27 || December 22 || Portland
| 
| James Harden (44)
| Dwight Howard (13)
| James Harden (7)
| Toyota Center18,316
| 20–7
|- style="background:#cfc;"
| 28 || December 26 || @ Memphis
| 
| James Harden (32)
| Dwight Howard (11)
| James Harden (10)
| FedExForum18,119
| 21–7
|- style="background:#fcc;"
| 29 || December 28 || @ San Antonio
| 
| James Harden (28)
| Dwight Howard (17)
| James Harden (5)
| AT&T Center18,581
| 21–8
|- style="background:#fcc;"
| 30 || December 29 || Washington
| 
| James Harden (33)
| Dorsey, Harden, Motiejūnas (6)
| Beverley, Harden, Terry (4)
| Toyota Center18,322
| 21–9
|- style="background:#cfc;"
| 31 || December 31 || Charlotte
| 
| James Harden (36)
| Dwight Howard (8)
| James Harden (6)
| Toyota Center18,276
| 22–9

|- style="background:#fcc;"
| 32 || January 2 || @ New Orleans
| 
| Brewer, Howard (12)
| Joey Dorsey (10)
| Kostas Papanikolaou (4)
| Smoothie King Center17,705
| 22–10
|- style="background:#cfc;"
| 33 || January 3 || Miami
| 
| James Harden (28)
| Dwight Howard (13)
| Trevor Ariza (4)
| Toyota Center18,338
| 23–10
|- style="background:#fcc;"
| 34 || January 5 || @ Chicago
| 
| Josh Smith (21)
| Dwight Howard (14)
| Patrick Beverley (6)
| United Center21,510
| 23–11
|- style="background:#cfc;"
| 35 || January 7 || @ Cleveland
| 
| James Harden (21)
| Dwight Howard (19)
| James Harden (9)
| Quicken Loans Arena20,562
| 24–11
|- style="background:#cfc;"
| 36 || January 8 || @ New York
| 
| James Harden (25)
| Dwight Howard (10)
| James Harden (9)
| Madison Square Garden19,812
| 25–11
|- style="background:#cfc;"
| 37 || January 10 || Utah
| 
| James Harden (30)
| Donatas Motiejūnas (10)
| Patrick Beverley (7)
| Toyota Center18,235
| 26–11
|- style="background:#cfc;"
| 38 || January 12 || @ Brooklyn
| 
| James Harden (30)
| Donatas Motiejūnas (11)
| James Harden (6)
| Barclays Center16,115
| 27–11
|- style="background:#fcc;"
| 39 || January 14 || @ Orlando
| 
| James Harden (26)
| Josh Smith (10)
| James Harden (10)
| Amway Center16,828
| 27–12
|- style="background:#cfc;"
| 40 || January 15 || Oklahoma City
| 
| James Harden (31)
| James Harden (9)
| James Harden (10)
| Toyota Center18,315
| 28–12
|- style="background:#fcc;"
| 41 || January 17 || Golden State
| 
| Dwight Howard (23)
| Dwight Howard (10)
| Ariza, Beverley, Harden (4)
| Toyota Center18,458
| 28–13
|- style="background:#cfc;"
| 42 || January 19 || Indiana
| 
| James Harden (45)
| Dwight Howard (17)
| James Harden (7)
| Toyota Center18,266
| 29–13
|- style="background:#fcc;"
| 43 || January 21 || @ Golden State
| 
| James Harden (33)
| Joey Dorsey (12)
| James Harden (6)
| Oracle Arena19,596
| 29–14
|- style="background:#cfc;"
| 44 || January 23 || @ Phoenix
| 
| James Harden (33)
| Ariza, Dorsey, Harden, Motiejūnas (6)
| James Harden (10)
| US Airways Center16,701
| 30–14
|- style="background:#cfc;"
| 45 || January 25 || @ L.A. Lakers
| 
| James Harden (37)
| Donatas Motiejūnas (9)
| Ariza, Harden (5)
| Staples Center18,997
| 31–14
|- style="background:#cfc;"
| 46 || January 28 || Dallas
| 
| Josh Smith (18)
| Josh Smith (6)
| James Harden (8)
| Toyota Center18,237
| 32–14
|- style="background:#cfc;"
| 47 || January 30 || @ Boston
| 
| Donatas Motiejūnas (26)
| Donatas Motiejūnas (12)
| James Harden (7)
| TD Garden17,675
| 33–14
|- style="background:#fcc;"
| 48 || January 31 || @ Detroit
| 
| James Harden (26)
| Harden, Smith (7)
| James Harden (9)
| Palace of Auburn Hills18,213
| 33–15

|- style="background:#cfc;"
| 49 || February 4 || Chicago
| 
| James Harden (27)
| Josh Smith (13)
| Harden, Smith (4)
| Toyota Center18,325
| 34–15
|- style="background:#cfc;"
| 50 || February 6 || Milwaukee
| 
| James Harden (33)
| Josh Smith (10)
| Josh Smith (8)
| Toyota Center18,239
| 35–15
|- style="background:#fcc;"
| 51 || February 8 || Portland
| 
| James Harden (45)
| James Harden (9)
| James Harden (8)
| Toyota Center18,243
| 35–16
|- style="background:#cfc;"
| 52 || February 10 || @ Phoenix
| 
| James Harden (40)
| James Harden (12)
| James Harden (9)
| US Airways Center17,071
| 36–16
|- style="background:#fcc;"
| 53 || February 11 || @ L.A. Clippers
| 
| Josh Smith (21)
| Josh Smith (13)
| Beverley, Harden (6)
| Staples Center19,060
| 36–17
|- align="center"
|colspan="9" bgcolor="#bbcaff"|All-Star Break
|- style="background:#fcc;"
| 54 || February 20 || @ Dallas
| 
| James Harden (26)
| Terrence Jones (9)
| James Harden (5)
| American Airlines Center20,389
| 36–18
|- style="background:#cfc;"
| 55 || February 21 || Toronto
| 
| Corey Brewer (26)
| Donatas Motiejūnas (11)
| James Harden (7)
| Toyota Center18,329
| 37–18
|- style="background:#cfc;"
| 56 || February 23 || Minnesota
| 
| James Harden (31)
| Terrence Jones (15)
| James Harden (10)
| Toyota Center18,240
| 38–18
|- style="background:#cfc;"
| 57 || February 25 || L.A. Clippers
| 
| James Harden (21)
| Motiejūnas, Smith (9)
| James Harden (10)
| Toyota Center18,154
| 39–18
|- style="background:#cfc;"
| 58 || February 27 || Brooklyn
| 
| Terrence Jones (26)
| Terrence Jones (12)
| James Harden (12)
| Toyota Center18,139
| 40–18

|- style="background:#cfc;"
| 59 || March 1 || Cleveland
| 
| James Harden (33)
| James Harden (8)
| Beverley, Harden (5)
| Toyota Center18,345
| 41–18
|- style="background:#fcc;"
| 60 || March 3 || @ Atlanta
| 
| Jason Terry (21)
| Jones, Motiejūnas (8)
| Beverley, Motiejūnas (7)
| Philips Arena18,968
| 41–19
|- style="background:#fcc;"
| 61 || March 4 || Memphis
| 
| Terrence Jones (21)
| Terrence Jones (9)
| James Harden (13)
| Toyota Center18,224
| 41–20
|- style="background:#cfc;"
| 62 || March 6 || Detroit
| 
| James Harden (38)
| James Harden (12)
| James Harden (12)
| Toyota Center18,193
| 42–20
|- style="background:#cfc;"
| 63 || March 7 || @ Denver
| 
| James Harden (28)
| Terrence Jones (11)
| James Harden (7)
| Pepsi Center15,231
| 43–20
|- style="background:#fcc;"
| 64 || March 11 || @ Portland
| 
| Corey Brewer (23)
| Terrence Jones (12)
| Ariza, Harden (6)
| Moda Center19,279
| 43–21
|- style="background:#fcc;"
| 65 || March 12 || @ Utah
| 
| Corey Brewer (25)
| Terrence Jones (10)
| James Harden (7) 
| EnergySolutions Arena18,781
| 43–22
|- style="background:#cfc;"
| 66 || March 15 || @ L.A. Clippers
| 
| James Harden (34)
| Terrence Jones (12)
| James Harden (7)
| Staples Center19,211
| 44–22
|- style="background:#cfc;"
| 67 || March 17 || Orlando
| 
| Donatas Motiejūnas (23)
| Corey Brewer (12)
| Patrick Beverley (7)
| Toyota Center18,235
| 45–22
|- style="background:#cfc;"
| 68 || March 19 || Denver
| 
| James Harden (50)
| James Harden (10)
| Patrick Beverley (7)
| Toyota Center18,456
| 46–22
|- style="background:#fcc;"
| 69 || March 21 || Phoenix
| 
| Donatas Motiejūnas (18)
| Trevor Ariza (12)
| Donatas Motiejūnas (6)
| Toyota Center18,340
| 46–23
|- style="background:#cfc;"
| 70 || March 23 || @ Indiana
| 
| James Harden (44)
| Trevor Ariza (11)
| James Harden (7)
| Bankers Life Fieldhouse16,201
| 47–23
|- style="background:#cfc;"
| 71 || March 25 || @ New Orleans
| 
| James Harden (25)
| Trevor Ariza (9)
| James Harden (10)
| Smoothie King Center17,077
| 48–23
|- style="background:#cfc;"
| 72 || March 27 || Minnesota
| 
| James Harden (33)
| Corey Brewer (10)
| Josh Smith (11)
| Toyota Center18,322
| 49–23
|- style="background:#cfc;"
| 73 || March 29 || @ Washington
| 
| James Harden (24)
| Howard, Smith (10)
| James Harden (6)
| Verizon Center20,356
| 50–23
|- style="background:#fcc;"
| 74 || March 30 || @ Toronto
| 
| James Harden (31)
| Trevor Ariza (8)
| Pablo Prigioni (7)
| Air Canada Centre19,800
| 50–24

|- style="background:#cfc;"
| 75 || April 1 || Sacramento
| 
| James Harden (51)
| Joey Dorsey (11)
| Pablo Prigioni (7)
| Toyota Center18,312
| 51–24
|- style="background:#cfc;"
| 76 || April 2 || @ Dallas
| 
| James Harden (24)
| Josh Smith (12)
| Ariza, Harden (6)
| American Airlines Center20,062
| 52–24
|- style="background:#cfc;"
| 77 || April 5 || @ Oklahoma City
| 
| James Harden (41)
| Trevor Ariza (9)
| James Harden (6)
| Chesapeake Energy Arena18,203
| 53–24
|- style="background:#fcc;"
| 78 || April 8 || @ San Antonio
| 
| James Harden (22)
| Dwight Howard (11)
| Prigioni, Smith (5)
| AT&T Center18,581
| 53–25
|- style="background:#fcc;"
| 79 || April 10 || San Antonio
| 
| Josh Smith (20)
| Dwight Howard (14)
| James Harden (10)
| Toyota Center18,457
| 53–26
|- style="background:#cfc;"
| 80 || April 12 || New Orleans
| 
| James Harden (30)
| Dwight Howard (11)
| James Harden (7)
| Toyota Center18,318
| 54–26
|- style="background:#cfc;"
| 81 || April 13 || @ Charlotte
| 
| James Harden (29)
| Jones, Smith (11)
| Harden, Prigioni (6)
| Time Warner Cable Arena15,797
| 55–26
|- style="background:#cfc;"
| 82 || April 15 || Utah
| 
| James Harden (16)
| James Harden (11)
| James Harden (10)
| Toyota Center18,320
| 56–26

Playoffs

|- style="background:#bfb;"
| 1
| April 18
| Dallas
| 
| James Harden (24)
| Trevor Ariza (11)
| James Harden (11)
| Toyota Center18,231
| 1–0
|- style="background:#bfb;"
| 2
| April 21
| Dallas
| 
| Dwight Howard (28)
| Dwight Howard (12)
| Josh Smith (9)
| Toyota Center18,243
| 2–0
|- style="background:#bfb;"
| 3
| April 24
| @ Dallas
| 
| James Harden (42)
| Dwight Howard (26)
| James Harden (9) 
| American Airlines Center20,651
| 3–0
|- style="background:#fbb;"
| 4
| April 26
| @ Dallas
| 
| James Harden (24)
| Dwight Howard (7)
| Harden, Prigioni (5) 
| American Airlines Center20,589
| 3–1
|- style="background:#bfb;"
| 5
| April 28
| Dallas
| 
| James Harden (28)
| Dwight Howard (19)
| James Harden (8)
| Toyota Center18,231
| 4–1

|-  style="background:#fbb;"
| 1
| May 4
| L. A. Clippers
| 
| Dwight Howard (22)
| Dwight Howard (10)
| James Harden (12)
| Toyota Center18,231
| 0–1
|- style="background:#bfb;"
| 2
| May 6
| L. A. Clippers
| 
| James Harden (32)
| Dwight Howard (16)
| James Harden (7)
| Toyota Center18,310
| 1–1
|- style="background:#fbb;"
| 3
| May 8
| @ L. A. Clippers
| 
| James Harden (25)
| Dwight Howard (14)
| James Harden (11)
| Staples Center19,367
| 1–2
|- style="background:#fbb;"
| 4
| May 10
| @ L. A. Clippers
| 
| James Harden (21)
| Ariza, Howard (8)
| James Harden (8)
| Staples Center19,490
| 1–3
|- style="background:#bfb;"
| 5
| May 12
| L. A. Clippers
| 
| James Harden (26)
| Dwight Howard (15)
| James Harden (10)
| Toyota Center18,142
| 2–3
|- style="background:#bfb;"
| 6
| May 14
| @ L. A. Clippers
| 
| James Harden (23)
| Dwight Howard (21)
| Jason Terry (5)
| Staples Center19,417
| 3–3
|- style="background:#bfb;"
| 7
| May 17
| L. A. Clippers
| 
| James Harden (31)
| Dwight Howard (15)
| James Harden (8)
| Toyota Center18,463
| 4–3

|- style="background:#fbb;"
| 1
| May 19
| @ Golden State
| 
| James Harden (28)
| Dwight Howard (13)
| James Harden (9)
| Oracle Arena19,596
| 0–1
|- style="background:#fbb;"
| 2
| May 21
| @ Golden State
| 
| James Harden (38)
| Dwight Howard (17)
| James Harden (9)
| Oracle Arena19,596
| 0–2
|- style="background:#fbb;"
| 3
| May 23
| Golden State
| 
| James Harden (17)
| Dwight Howard (14)
| Harden, Smith (4)
| Toyota Center18,282
| 0–3
|- style="background:#bfb;"
| 4
| May 25
| Golden State
| 
| James Harden (45)
| Dwight Howard (12)
| Harden, Smith (5)
| Toyota Center18,239
| 1–3
|- style="background:#fbb;"
| 5
| May 27
| @ Golden State
| 
| Dwight Howard (18)
| Dwight Howard (16)
| James Harden (5)
| Oracle Arena19,596
| 1–4

Roster

Salaries

Player statistics

Regular season

|- align="center" bgcolor=""
| 
| 82 || 82 || 35.7 || .402 || .350 || .850 || 5.6 || 2.5 || style=background:#C5001E;color:white;| 1.9 || 0.2 || 12.8
|- align="center" bgcolor="f0f0f0"
| 
| 56 || 55 || 30.8 || .383 || .356 || .750 || 4.2 || 3.4 || 1.1 || 0.4 || 10.1
|- align="center" bgcolor=""
| ‡‡
| 25 || 12 || 15.7 || .542 || .000 || .520 || 5.1 || 0.3 || 0.2 || 0.1 || 4.2
|- align="center" bgcolor="f0f0f0"
| 
| 56 || 1 || 25.1 || .429 || .284 || .760 || 3.6 || 1.7 || 1.1 || 0.3 || 11.9
|- align="center" bgcolor=""
| ‡
| 25 || 9 || 14.8 || .405 || .381 || .760 || 2.7 || 2.0 || 0.7 || 0.0 || 6.2
|- align="center" bgcolor="f0f0f0"
| 
| 12 || 0 || 7.5 || .483 || .000 || .170 || 3.0 || 0.2 || 0.1 || 0.8 || 2.7
|- align="center" bgcolor=""
| ‡
| 17 || 0 || 6.4 || .319 || .302 || .750 || 0.4 || 0.2 || 0.0 || 0.0 || 2.7
|- align="center" bgcolor="f0f0f0"
| 
| 69 || 17 || 12.4 || .552 || .000 || .290 || 4.0 || 0.4 || 0.6 || 0.4 || 2.7 
|- align="center" bgcolor=""
| ‡‡
| 14 || 0 || 14.3 || .270 || .222 || .250 || 1.2 || 1.1 || 0.6 || 0.4 || 3.2
|- align="center" bgcolor="f0f0f0"
| 
| 81 || 81 || style=background:#C5001E;color:white;| 36.8 || .440 || .375 || style=background:#C5001E;color:white;| .870 || 5.7 || style=background:#C5001E;color:white;| 7.0 || style=background:#C5001E;color:white;| 1.9 || 0.7 || style=background:#C5001E;color:white;| 27.4
|- align="center" bgcolor=""
| 
| 41 || 41 || 29.8 || style=background:#C5001E;color:white;| .593 || style=background:#C5001E;color:white;| .500 || .530 || style=background:#C5001E;color:white;| 10.5 || 1.2 || 0.7 || 1.3 || 15.8 
|- align="center" bgcolor="f0f0f0"
| 
| 28 || 0 || 9.4 || .347 || .238 || .680 || 1.4 || 0.4 || 0.3 || 0.1 || 2.6
|- align="center" bgcolor=""
| 
| 33 || 24 || 26.9 || .528 || .351 || .610 || 6.7 || 1.1 || 0.6 || style=background:#C5001E;color:white;| 1.8 || 11.7
|- align="center" bgcolor="f0f0f0"
| 
| 10 || 0 || 3.3 || .333 || .000 || .500 || 0.5 || 0.2 || 0.0 || 0.2 || 1.1
|- align="center" bgcolor=""
| 
| 71 || 62 || 28.7 || .504 || .368 || .600 || 5.9 || 1.8 || 0.8 || 0.5 || 12.0
|- align="center" bgcolor="f0f0f0"
| 
| 43 || 1 || 18.5 || .350 || .292 || .720 || 2.7 || 2.0 || 0.7 || 0.3 || 4.2
|- align="center" bgcolor=""
| 
| 24 || 0 || 16.8 || .343 || .275 || style=background:#C5001E;color:white;| .870 || 1.6 || 2.8 || 1.1 || 0.0 || 3.0 
|- align="center" bgcolor="f0f0f0"
| ‡
| 9 || 0 || 6.6 || .333 || .333 || .820 || 0.4 || 0.3 || 0.1 || 0.0 || 3.2
|- align="center" bgcolor=""
| 
| 55 || 7 || 25.5 || .438 || .330 || .520 || 6.0 || 2.6 || 0.9 || 1.2 || 12.0
|- align="center" bgcolor="f0f0f0"
| 
| 77 || 18 || 21.3 || .422 || .390 || .810 || 1.6 || 1.9 || 0.9 || 0.3 || 7.0
|}
‡Traded mid-season
‡‡Waived during season

Injuries

Transactions

The Rockets had a busy offseason, trading away key contributors Jeremy Lin and Ömer Aşık in July to clear cap space. Houston was after marquee free agents such as LeBron James, Chris Bosh, and Carmelo Anthony, but struck out on all three of those players. The Rockets also let Chandler Parsons, another key contributor from the previous season, sign with the Dallas Mavericks in July, declining to match the hefty offer sheet Parsons received from Dallas. The Rockets would eventually make up for these losses throughout the summer and regular season. As part of the Aşık deal, the Rockets received Trevor Ariza from the Washington Wizards in a sign and trade. Ariza replaced Parsons as the team's starting small forward. In September, the team traded for Jason Terry, a former sixth man of the year with the Mavericks. Terry provided veteran leadership and a spark off the bench for the Rockets. In December, the Rockets acquired Corey Brewer and Josh Smith, who both added significant depth to the roster. At the trade deadline in February, the Rockets acquired Pablo Prigioni and K. J. McDaniels in two separate deals.

Trades

Free agents

Re-signed

Additions

Subtractions

Notes

Awards, records and milestones

Records
Clint Capela missed the first 15 free throw attempts of his career, setting an NBA record.

Milestones
On December 13, Dwight Howard reached 10,000 career rebounds.  At , Howard became the third youngest player in NBA history to reach 10,000 career rebounds.  Only Wilt Chamberlain (28 years, 81 days) and Bill Russell (28 years, 285 days) reached the milestone at a younger age.

References

External links

 2014–15 Houston Rockets preseason at ESPN
 2014–15 Houston Rockets regular season at ESPN

Houston Rockets seasons
Houston Rockets